Crypto-politics is the secret support for a political belief. It may refer to:
 Crypto-communism
 Crypto-fascism
 Synarchism: rule by a secret elite
 Cryptocracy